AVE.com was a Kyrgyz-UAE airline based in Sharjah, United Arab Emirates with its base at Sharjah International Airport, offered charter flights and aircraft lease services. AVE.com was established in 2005 by the renaming of Phoenix Aviation

AVE.com was owned by Evgeny Khaprov and Vladimir Goncharov and (as of 2007) had 230 employees.

History
Phoenix Aviation was established and started operations in 1996. It was rebranded as AVE.com in October 2005.

The airline was blacklisted by the Government of the United Kingdom due to poor safety standards, and was added to a newly created European Union blacklist in 2006.

Services
As Phoenix Aviation, the company operated the following services in January 2005:

Domestic scheduled services: Bishkek and Osh.
International scheduled services: Jinnah International Airport, Karachi.

Fleet

AVE.com operated the following aircraft:

See also
List of defunct airlines of the United Arab Emirates
List of defunct airlines of Kyrgyzstan

References

External links

Official website (archive)
Phoenix Aviation

Defunct airlines of the United Arab Emirates
Airlines established in 1996
Airlines disestablished in 2012
Emirati companies established in 1996